The 1994 World Ninepin Bowling Classic Championships was the twentieth edition of the championships and was held in Ludwigshafen, Germany, from 15 to 22 May 1994.

Team competitions has been played in two independent groups. In men group A triumphed Slovenia, and among women, Germans. In group B, both among women and men, the Czechs won.
In the men pair competition won Romanians - Stelian Boariu and Vasia Donos. In single event triumphed Firedhelm Zänger and in combination Romanian Stelian Boariu.
In the women pair won Czechs - Vlastimila Cahová and Naděžda Dobešová. Naděžda Dobešová also won in single competition, while Hungarian Ágota Kovácsné Grampsch triumphed in combination.

Participating teams

Men

Women

Medal summary

Medal table

Men

Women

References 
 WC Archive on KZS
 WC History on WNBA NBC

World Ninepin Bowling Classic Championships
1994 in bowling
1994 in German sport
International sports competitions hosted by Germany
Sport in Ludwigshafen